Alejandro Durano Almendras (27 February 1919 – 4 August 1995) was a Filipino politician who served as a Senator of the Philippines. He was also governor of the then united Davao province.

Early life and education
Almendras was born in Danao, Cebu on February 27, 1919 to Paulo Almendras and Elisea Mercado Durano. He finished his secondary education studies at the Cebu Provincial High in 1938. He attended the Far Eastern University taking up aeronautical engineering as his college degree but his studies was interrupted in 1941 due to World War II. After the war, Almendras went back to his studies and attended Mindanao Colleges in Davao City.

World War II
Almendras was enlisted with the Philippine Army Air Corps during the World War II. Following the surrender of the United States Army Forces in the Far East (USAFFE) to the Japanese Imperial Army, he went back to Cebu and served under the command of Col. James M. Cushing. At age 23, Almendras was named as commander of the 88th Infantry Regiment of the Cebu Area Command. After the war, Almendras was awarded the Outstanding Veteran in 1958 for his contribution for the country during the war.

Political career
In 1951, Almendras who was a third year law student of Mindanao Colleges at that time ran for governor of Davao province against incumbent Ricardo D. Miranda of Liberal Party, who took office in 1948 and the first elected governor since the aftermath of World War II. Almendras became the youngest governor in the country at that time and was re-elected again in 1955. Almendras served as governor until 1958, when he was succeeded by Vicente Duterte. The foreign correspondents’ Association of the Philippines conferred him with the "Outstanding Governor" award.

For the 1959 senatorial election, Almendras was named as part of the senatorial slate of the Nacionalista Party of the then incumbent President Carlos P. Garcia. On May 8, 1959, months later after he was named part of the slate, Almendras was appointed as the first secretary of the Department of General Services by President Garcia. In early February 1959, Almendras was named as the "Most Outstanding Cabinet Member” by the Confederation of Filipino Veterans.

At the 1959 senatorial elections on November 10, Almendras was elected as senator taking up the eight and last slot for the position. He was re-elected in 1971, and served as senator until 1972. After the declaration of Martial Law by Ferdinand Marcos, Almendras became a Member of the Interim Batasang Pambansa representing Southern Mindanao or Region XI. He served the position from June 12, 1978 until June 5, 1984.

Death and legacy
Almendras died on August 4, 1995 due to a lingering illness. The senators of the 10th Congress of the Philippines credited him for the passing of Republic Act 3018 which nationalized the rice and corn industry and the law that is responsible for the foundation of the Veterans Bank. Then house speaker, Jose de Venecia Jr. noted his role for the partition of Davao province which he said brought socio-economic development in area which was part of the former province. Due to his work and the resulting province Almendras is known as the "Father of Davao".

Personal life
Almendras was married to Caridad Cabahug of Borbon, Cebu with whom he had seven children.

References

1919 births
1995 deaths
Governors of former provinces of the Philippines
People from Danao, Cebu
Senators of the 7th Congress of the Philippines
Senators of the 6th Congress of the Philippines
Senators of the 5th Congress of the Philippines
Senators of the 4th Congress of the Philippines
Far Eastern University alumni
Members of the Batasang Pambansa
Garcia administration cabinet members